Ihor Yevstakhiyovych Kulchytskyi (born 13 August 1941) is a retired Soviet football player, Master of Sports of the USSR.

Biography
Kulchytsky was born during World War II in occupied by the Nazi Germany Western Ukraine. After the war he finished the Lviv Institute of Physical Culture and the school of Journalism of Lviv University.

From 1961 to 1973 Kulchytsky was a non-amateur football player, playing mostly in the All-Soviet competitions, while spending some years in other clubs from the western Ukraine. In 1969 being a captain of Karpaty Lviv, he led the team to victory in the Soviet Cup competition where in final at Luzhniki Stadium of Vladimir Lenin they beat Rostov Army team.

Upon retiring Kulchytsky studied at the Higher school of coaches in Moscow. In 1987–88 he was a children coach of his former sports school (Sports school 4). In 1989 Kulchytsky became a team administrator of Karpaty Lviv. Later he worked for cities authorities until 2001. Since then Kulchytsky represents Karpaty at the Football Federation of Lviv Oblast.

Honours
 Soviet Cup winner: 1969.

International career
Kulchytsky made his debut for USSR on 17 February 1971 in a friendly against Mexico.

References
  Profile

1941 births
Living people
Sportspeople from Lviv
Ukrainian footballers
Soviet footballers
Soviet Union international footballers
FC Karpaty Lviv players
FC Dynamo Kyiv players
FC Naftovyk Drohobych players
Higher School of Coaches alumni
Lviv State University of Physical Culture alumni
University of Lviv alumni
Association football midfielders